Kenley is a ward covering the Kenley area of the London Borough of Croydon in the United Kingdom. It elects 2 councillors following the boundary changes made official on 3 May 2018. On 6 May 2021, 5 by-elections were held in Croydon following the resignation of 5 councillors across New Addington North, South Norwood, Kenley, Park Hill and Whitgift and Woodside.

List of Councillors

Mayoral election results 
Below are the results for the candidate which received the highest share of the popular vote in the ward at each mayoral election.

Ward Results

References 

Wards of the London Borough of Croydon